This is a listing of statistical records and milestone achievements of the Minnesota Twins franchise.

Single-season records

Batting

Pitching

Single-game records

Individual
Most strikeouts in a single game: Johan Santana, 17 K in 8 IP, August 19, 2007

As a team

 * Date listed is date of most recent occurrence of record.
1 Opponent listed is opponent that record occurred against most recently.
2 Indicates record in an extra-inning game (total innings in parentheses).
3 Indicates record with number accumulated by both clubs.
4 Indicates record in an extra-inning game, with number accumulated by both clubs (total innings in parentheses)

All-Time leaders

Batting

Games played

At bats

Runs

Hits

Doubles

Triples

Home runs

RBI

Total bases

Walks

Strikeouts

Stolen bases

Caught stealing

On-base percentage

Slugging percentage

Batting average

Pitching

Wins

Losses

ERA

Games played

Games started

Complete games

Shutouts

Saves

Innings pitched

Rare feats

No-hitters

Dean Chance also threw a perfect game through five innings on August 6, 1967, against the Boston Red Sox, but the game was shortened due to rain.  Under MLB rule revisions in 1991, it is not recognized as an official no-hitter or perfect game.

Hit for the cycle

Triple plays

†See below

Six-hit games

Major League Baseball records and firsts
 First team to record two triple plays in the same game: July 17, 1990 vs. Boston Red Sox (lost game 1–0).
 First team to reach the playoffs after losing 100 games the previous year.
 On August 31, 2019 Mitch Garver hit his 20th HR of the season, becoming the 8th Twins player to hit 20 or more home runs in a season.  This sets an MLB record.
 On September 17, 2019 Miguel Sano hit his 30th HR of the season, becoming the 5th Twins player to hit 30 or more home runs in a season.  This sets an MLB record.
 Longest postseason losing streak: 18 games (2004-2020).

References

External links
Twins history at mlb.com
Player Information at baseball-reference.com

Records
Minnesota Twins